Vincenzo Florio Sr. (Bagnara Calabra, 4 April 1799 – Palermo, 11 September 1868) was an Italian entrepreneur and politician, member of the rich Florio economic dynasty, one of the wealthiest Sicilian families during the late 19th century.

Early life
Vincenzo Florio was born in Bagnara Calabra on 4 April 1799 of Paolo Florio and Giuseppa Safflotti. Soon after his birth, the family moved to Palermo (Sicily), where his father opened a drug store. He received an excellent education, under the guidance of his uncle Ignazio, he learned art and the practice of business.

In 1807, when Vincenzo was only eight years old, his father died, bequeathing him his spice shop, which had become relatively prosperous. Too young to take care of it, his uncle Ignazio Florio, a former associate of his father, directed and managed in his place the administration of commerce which was now called Ignazio & Vincenzo Florio. Gradually, the store  became increasingly important and created a name as the most famous spice shop in Palermo. The financial legacy of Vincenzo and his uncle tripled in the decade between 1807 and 1817. In 1829, Ignazio Florio died without descendants and Vincenzo became the sole heir to the family shop.

Business career
He pioneered in tuna fishing and its canned preparation in Palermo. In 1841, Vincenzo rented all the tuna fishing grounds, then an important sector of activity in Sicily, at the Aegadian Islands, launching what would become one of the most lucrative business activities of the Florio family. Historians attribute Vincenzo Florio with introducing in Sicily the system of fishing with fixed nets and conservation under oil, thus increasing his trade and financial wealth. In addition, he also bought shares in a Sicilian-British marine insurance company.

In 1832 he established a factory of Marsala wine (Cantina Florio) in Marsala. His winery was in between the ones of John Woodhouse and Benjamin Ingham (1784-1861), the original British pioneers in the Marsala wine trade. Florio became the first Italian producer of Marsala wine. He built splendid cellars in the town's tuff rock in which to produce and conserve the wine.

Florio also invested in the sulfur trade, mainly to the British Empire. In 1840, he co-founded Anglo-Sicilian Sulfur Company Limited in Palermo with the British entrepreneurs Benjamin Ingham – also engaged in Marsala wineries – and Agostino Porry, for the production and marketing of sulfuric acid and sulfur derivatives. In 1841, he founded the Oretea foundry. His business acumen was such that he became the intermediary for the city of Palermo of the bank of the Rothschild family and as the founder of Banco Florio, he himself became a renowned banker in Palermo and Sicily with many aristocratic families and the upper middle class.

As a ship owner he promoted the development of maritime communications with the continent, building numerous steamers. In 1840, he had started the Società dei battelli a vapore siciliani with Ingham and other small shareholders. In October 1861, soon after Sicily was incorporated into the Kingdom of Italy, he founded the Societa in Accomandita Piroscafi Postali-Ignazio & Vicenzo Florio (Florio Line) with a fleet of nine steamers.

In politics
After the demise of the Kingdom of the Two Sicilies in 1861 and incorporation into the new Kingdom of Italy, Florio had to face the new political-economic context, especially as his relations with the past regime could have made the new Italian government less benevolent. Not that he was openly compromised, but his participation in the Sicilian revolution of 1848 had been lukewarm and conditioned by the concern to safeguard his assets and economic interests. At the time he had refused, for lack of guarantees, a loan to the revolution for a supply of arms. However, the new rulers were more interested to establish peaceful relations with the productive bourgeoisie of the new regions.

Nominated as senator in 1864, he died in Palermo on 11 September 1868, leaving a patrimony of 12,000,000 lire, for almost two thirds composed by the winery in Marsala and by the interests in the shipping company. He had married Giulia Portalupi from Milan, from whom he had two daughters, Angelina and Giuseppa, and a son, Ignazio Florio Sr. (1838-1891), who took over the management of the business empire of the family.

References

 Massafra, Angelo (ed.) (1988). Il Mezzogiorno preunitario: economia, società e istituzioni, Università di Bari, Dipartimento di scienze storiche e sociali, Bari: Edizioni Dedalo

External links 
 I Florio, RAI documentary.
 The Florios, bestofsicily.com.
 Vincenzo Florio - Official site of the Italian Senate

Vincenzo Sr
19th-century Italian businesspeople
Members of the Senate of the Kingdom of Italy
Businesspeople from Palermo
1799 births
1868 deaths
People from Bagnara Calabra